Mazraat En Nahr, also spelled Mazret Al Nahr, Mazraat El Nahr or Mazraat Al Nahr, is a village located on the border line of the Zgharta District and the Bsharri District in the North Governorate of Lebanon. Situated in the Valley of Qadisha, between the villages of villages Tourza and Sereel, Mazraat En Nahr is considered a holy and spiritual place in Eastern Christianity.

Etymology/Demographics
Mazraat Al Nahr is a Lebanese word meaning “Farm/Planting by the river.” The name derives from the agricultural production of potatoes, onions, fruits, and vegetables all by the side river of El Karya and El Ghar Spring. The population of Mazraat En Nahr is approximately 378 people, but no official census has been taken lately. Historically, the inhabitants of Mazraat En Nahr were a mixture of many peoples. The majority were Cannanites, Phoenicians, and Aramiin, who later became known as the Syriac.

Lebanese diaspora from Mazraat En Nahr number approximately 20,000 worldwide, residing primarily in Australia, the United States and Canada.

Religion
The population is majority Maronite Christian.

Agriculture
Potatoes, Onions, Fruits and Vegetables. The village water is supplied from the El Karya and El Ghar springs.

Location/Tourism
At an altitude of 567 meters above mean sea level, Mazraat En Nahr is 98 km from Beirut, 24 km from Tripoli, and 19 km from Zgharta. An annual celebration, The Feast of Mar Youssef (Saint Joseph), occurs on 19 March.

Local routes to the village: Tripoli - Zgharta - Kfar Hata - Aarjis - Kfar Fou - Karm Seddeh - Sereel - Mazraat En Nahr.
Alternative: Ehden - Sereel - Mazraat En Nahr.

Lodging
Saqiyat al `Abd - 2 km or 2 miles
Saqiet el Abd - 2 km or 2 miles
Mgharet Abou Aali - 4 km or 3 miles
Magharat Abu `Ali - 4 km or 3 miles
Dahr Abou Taiya - 6 km or 4 miles
Dahr Abu Tayyah - 6 km or 4 miles
Ed Doueir - 6 km or 4 miles
Saqiet el Aakre - 2 km or 1 miles
Saqiyat al `Akirah - 2 km or 1 miles
Harf el Aalem - 5 km or 3 miles
Harf al `Alam - 5 km or 3 miles
Al `Aqabah - 2 km or 2 miles
El Aaqabe - 2 km or 2 miles
Qada' `Alayh - 3 km or 2 miles
Al Baruk - 6 km or 4 miles

References

External links

Ehden Family Tree

Populated places in the North Governorate
Zgharta District
Maronite Christian communities in Lebanon